The 2022 Drexler-Automotive Formula 3 Cup was the 41st Austria Formula 3 Cup season and the fourth Drexler-Automotive Formula 3 Cup season.

Teams and drivers
All Cup cars were built before 2018, Trophy cars were built between 1990 and 2007, and Open class have more powerful engines.

Notes

Race calendar and results 
Series finale at Mugello was originally scheduled for 23 October, but later date was moved a week earlier.

Footnote

Championship standings

Half points were awarded if less than 5 competitors participated.
Standings for all competitions are shown below.

Drexler-Automotive Formula 3 Cup

Drexler-Automotive Formula 3 Open

References

External links 
Website of the AFR Cups [German]

Austria Formula 3 Cup
Formula 3
Drexler-Automotive F3 Cup
Drexler-Automotive F3 Cup
Drexler-Automotive F3 Cup